Carabdytes is a genus of predaceous diving beetles in the family Dytiscidae. Carabdytes upin was formerly the sole species of this genus, but nine species in the genus Rhantus were transferred to Carabdytes as a result of research published by Balke et al. in 2017.

Species
These 10 species belong to the genus Carabdytes:
 Carabdytes alutaceus (Fauvel, 1883)
 Carabdytes guadalcanalensis (Balke, 1998)
 Carabdytes monteithi (Balke, Wewalka, Alarie & Ribera, 2007)
 Carabdytes novaecaledoniae (Balfour-Browne, 1944)
 Carabdytes oceanicus (Balke, 1993)
 Carabdytes pacificus (Boisduval, 1835)
 Carabdytes plantaris (Sharp, 1882)
 Carabdytes poellerbauerae (Balke, Wewalka, Alarie & Ribera, 2007)
 Carabdytes pseudopacificus (Balke, 1993)
 Carabdytes upin Balke, Hendrich & Wewalka 1992

References

External links

 

Dytiscidae genera
Monotypic Adephaga genera